The Guardian-class patrol boats are a class of small patrol vessels designed and built in Australia and provided to small South Pacific Ocean countries as part of the Australian Government's Pacific Maritime Security Program.

The class is designed to be updated replacements for the s provided to its allies from 1987 to 1997. Australia provided twenty-two Pacific Forum vessels to twelve nations. They were designed to use commercial off the shelf components, to make them easier to maintain for the small nations that would operate them. Australia stood ready to help with training and maintenance, during the duration of the program, because Australia's external security issues were eased if it could count on its sovereign neighbours having resources to police their own external security.

Austal was commissioned to build 19 Guardian-class boats in 2016. Austal's contract allows it to market the design to additional customers. Subsequently, an additional three vessels were ordered. Two for Timor-Leste, and one new replacement vessel for the Samoan , which was damaged beyond repair on 5 August 2021. The last vessels are scheduled for delivery in late 2023.

Austal delivered  to the Papua New Guinea Defence Force on 30 November 2018. Her engines broke down in October 2019, and she had to be towed to Australia for repairs.

Background

Following a 1979 Australian and New Zealand assessment of Pacific Islands maritime patrol needs and the 1982 United Nations Convention on the Law of the Sea, it became evident to all parties that the Pacific Islands were in need of several patrol vessels. The Australian Government decided to meet this need by launching the Pacific Patrol Boat Program, in which Australia would gift 22  to 12 allied Pacific Island nations between 1987 and 1997. In addition to simply improving diplomatic relations between the countries, Australia benefited by having their external security issues eased as it could count on its sovereign neighbours having resources to police their own waters.

The Pacific Forum vessels were designed to use commercial off the shelf components, to make them easier to maintain for the small nations that would operate them. Though, if needed, Australia stood ready to help with training and maintenance during the duration of the original program. This included refits after fifteen years of operation, which extended the projected service life of the last vessels to 2027.

The Australian government launched the  Pacific Patrol Boat Replacement Program in June 2014.

There has been political disagreement within Australia as to whether it was sensible for Australia to fund the Pacific class. There is reportedly also an element of competition between Australia and China for the affections of the Pacific Islands nations.

Roles

Like the class of vessels they will replace, these small vessels will allow Australia's small neighbours to patrol their own economic zones. They will be able to control smuggling, unregulated fishing, and perform search and rescue duties. A Royal Australian Navy rear admiral said upon the delivery of Taro to the Solomon Islands that the Guardian class "play an important role in tackling our shared regional security challenges [...] We are better positioned to respond to maritime threats, from illegal fishing to transnational crime, by working together, co-ordinating closely, and building our interoperability."

The Guardian class will be slightly larger, will have better sea-keeping capabilities, and their electronics suite will be up to date.

Design

The Australian government called for submission in March 2015. Five consortia submitted designs for the class. Austal was chosen as the contractor in April 2016.

Main design

They are designed to berth a complement of 23 crew members. They will have a stern launching ramp for a pursuit boat, also improving search and rescue capabilities.

The vessel's twin diesel engines can provide . Sophisticated electronic engine controls will help conserve fuel.

One of the main deck staterooms, a stateroom with two bunks, is equipped with separate ventilation, so it can be used as an infirmary for infectious patients.

The patrol boats operated by Papua New Guinea will be armed. However, it is not clear what this will consist of.

During INDO PACIFIC 2022 Austal revealed an up-armed variant of the Guardian dubbed the 40-A.

Design defects

Several design flaws have been identified in finished vessels. The flaws were reported publicly in June 2022, after fifteen vessels had been delivered.

Recipient nations were notified in February 2021 of a vessel experiencing cracking in the coupling between the engine and the gear box. Two separate air quality faults were also discovered in May 2022. The medical bay ventilation system reportedly uses recirculated air, when fresh air is advised. It was also reported that a fault in the exhaust system caused carbon monoxide to enter a normally uncrewed compartment, posing a safety risk.

Austal has reportedly "accepted that the problems are latent defects that it will work to resolve."

Orders and delivery

Austal was commissioned to build 19 Guardian-class boats in 2016. This was less than the 22 s Australia ordered for the same recipients back in the 1980s. The Federated States of Micronesia, Fiji and Tonga, who had operated three Pacific-class boats each from the original program, were to be gifted two Guardian-class patrol boats each as replacements. While the patrol boats are gifts and become the recipient's sovereign property upon delivery, the purchase contract contains provisions for Austal to provide maintenance support to the client states, for seven years, out of its Cairns facility.

The keel of the first vessel was laid in July 2017. That vessel was scheduled to be delivered to Papua New Guinea in October 2018. New vessels were scheduled to be completed every three months. The first vessel was delivered on 30 November 2018, and commissioned into the Papua New Guinea Defence Force (PNGDF) on 1 February 2019. The second was commissioned into the Tuvalu Police Force on 5 April 2019. The fourth vessel was delivered to Samoa on 16 August 2019.

Australia announced on 19 April 2018 that they ordered two more vessels to gift them to Timor-Leste. Timor-Leste did not receive Pacific Forum boats in the original program.

In June 2021, the Australian Defense Forces agreed to PNGDF's request to arm their four patrol boats. Two boats had been delivered to Papua New Guinea at the time. It is unclear which armaments will be installed and who will install them on behalf of the ADF.

During a visit to Apia in June 2022, Foreign Minister Penny Wong announced that Australia will build an additional vessel to replace Nafanua II, which was damaged beyond repair on 5 August 2021.

Operational history and incidents

In October 2019, 's engines broke down, and she had to be towed to Australia for repairs.

In the winter of 2020–2021, an unidentified vessel experienced cracking in the coupling between the engine and the gear box.

On 5 August 2021 the Samoan Nafanua II ran aground on a reef near Salelologa wharf while transporting police officers to Savai'i to manage a protest. Australian specialists loaded her onto a barge and transported her to Cairns for assessment. She was found to be beyond economical repair, and given back to Australia for disposal. On 21 December 2021 the officer-in-charge of the boat at the time of the accident, Superintendent Taito Sefo Faaoi Hunt, was found guilty on three charges of negligence by a Police disciplinary tribunal. On 4 January he was fined  and demoted from superintendent to corporal.

In mid-May 2022, an unidentified vessel experienced a carbon monoxide exhaust leak into a normally uncrewed compartment.

List of boats in class

See also
 , the United States is providing 13 small patrol vessels to small Caribbean nations
 Pacific Islands Forum
 Forum Fisheries Agency
 Operation Kurukuru

References

Law enforcement equipment
 
Patrol boat classes